Mount Cory can refer to:

 Mount Cory (Alberta), a mountain in Alberta, Canada
 Mount Cory, Ohio, a village in Ohio, United States